Gretel and Hansel is a point and click horror Flash game released in two parts in 2009 and 2010 by a Texas-based developer going by the nom de plume "makopudding". The game is based on the original tale by the Brothers Grimm and also incorporate other creatures and characters from other stories authored by them. The game has been played over 2 million times on Newgrounds alone.

Gameplay
TBA

Plot
TBA

Development
TBA

Reception
The animation was praised for its smoothness, but many players complained of lag, making the game unnecessarily difficult. The first part was listed on a "best freeware games of 2009" list in Gamasutra.

References

External Links
 Gretel and Hansel
 Gretel and Hansel Part 2

Flash games
2009 video games
2000s horror video games
Point-and-click adventure games